Voisins-le-Bretonneux is a commune in the Yvelines department in the Île-de-France region in north-central France. It is located in the south-western suburbs of Paris  from the centre in the new town of Saint-Quentin-en-Yvelines.

Population

Transport
Voisins-le-Bretonneux has no Paris Métro, RER, or suburban rail station. The closest station to Voisins-le-Bretonneux is Saint-Quentin-en-Yvelines–Montigny-le-Bretonneux station on Paris RER line C, on the Transilien La Défense suburban rail line, and on the Transilien Paris – Montparnasse suburban rail line. This station is located in the neighboring commune of Montigny-le-Bretonneux,  from the town centre of Voisins-le-Bretonneux.

Economy

The commune has the head office of Europcar.

In 2010, the median income per household was 60 262 € (=80,148.46 USD 2010), ranking Voisins-le-Bretonneux 37th among the 31,525 communes with more than 39 households in metropolitan France.

Education
 the municipality's preschools had 408 students, while the elementary schools had 766 students. The municipality puts these schools into six groups.
 Groupe scolaire Les 40 Arpents
 Groupe scolaire La Grande Île
 Groupe scolaire Les Pépinières
 Groupe scolaire Le Bois de la Garenne
 Groupe scolaire Le Lac
 Groupe scolaire La Sente des Carrières
There is also a private primary school, Les Tilleuls.

Twin towns – sister cities

Voisins-le-Bretonneux is twinned with:
 Irvine, Scotland, United Kingdom
 Łuków, Poland
 Schenefeld, Germany

See also
Communes of the Yvelines department

References

External links

Official website
Official website 

Communes of Yvelines
Saint-Quentin-en-Yvelines